Angel Town is a 1990 martial arts film directed by Eric Karson and starring Olivier Gruner, who made his film debut as a French martial artist and foreign exchange student who helps his borders by using his skills against a local gang.

Plot

Jacques Montaigne is a French college student who heads to Los Angeles not only for school, but to help train an Olympic team of fighters. He shows up a few days late (for a rendezvous with a girlfriend in France) and is given a list of houses where they may have rooms for rent. He comes across to a house where single mother Maria Ordonez lives with her son Martin and her mother. Maria tells Jacques that they were supposed to have taken their house off the listings due to being in an unsafe neighborhood. However, Maria decides to let Jacques stay.

That night, on his way to a college social, Jacques finds himself confronted by two neighbors, Chuy and Jesus. Brandishing a small knife, Jacques warns the duo not to mess with him. At the mixer, Jacques gets the attention of fellow student Sarah as well as the graduate dean, who is unimpressed with him. As Jacques walks Sara home, they are stopped by Jesus and Chuy, who are with their gang boss, Angel and other gang members. When some of the gang members start to cause trouble, Jacques intervenes and uses his martial arts skills. This scares Angel and the gang away. However, when Jacques returns to the Ordonez home, he is met again by Jesus, Chuy, and more of Angel's gang. An attempt to ambush Jacques leads them to a nearby bush, where the gang members beat themselves up while Jacques walks away. This impresses Frank, a former war vet who lives across the street, but is also upset at the fact that he's paralyzed from the waist down from the war.

It's been revealed that Angel wants to recruit Martin to his gang. When Martin constantly rebuffs Angel, it only makes him even more mad and threats soon follow. Jacques decides he must help Martin out of his ordeal. During an attack at the house, Martin's grandmother passes out from the stress and is taken to the hospital. With Maria working, Jacques decides to take Martin to a local martial arts school run by good friend Henry, who is the one who convinced the Olympic Committee to bring Jacques to L.A. Henry knew Martin's father Pedro, who had protested vehemently against Angel and his gang and was ultimately murdered by Angel, which Martin doesn't know. Jacques decides to teach Martin some self-defense along with Henry and tells him the ramifications of what can and will happen should Martin decide to join Angel's gang.

Upon returning home, Martin is in shock to learn his grandmother had passed. It was because Angel's goons once again started trouble and Frank tells Jacques that she ended up having a massive heart attack, yelling for Martin. Maria has learned what Jacques had been doing and she realizes that she can trust him and divulges the truth about Pedro's death and why the streets are no longer safe. When Maria and Jacques are shot at by Angel and his gang, Jacques turns to Henry and his wife to help protect Maria and Martin. Henry finds a connection with Mr. Park, a Korean gang boss who knows of all the gangs. He warns Henry and Jacques that Angel can be intimidated, but it is his gunfire that gives him his power.

On his way to campus, Angel sends men to get rid of Jacques but they fail. Jacques has had enough and wages war on Angel and his crew. He goes as far as killing Angel's female driver to send him a message. However, Angel declares war and begins with a vicious assault on Maria, who is taken to the hospital. Martin, having had enough, goes back to his house and arms himself with a shotgun. With the help of Frank, who arms himself with a machine gun, the duo begin to shoot at any of Angel's gang who invade Martin's house. When Angel and the rest of the gang show up, they slowly begin their assault. However, just when Martin runs out of ammo, one gang member throws a stick of dynamite but is stopped by a returning Jacques.

Jacques has also brought Henry and some of Henry's martial arts students. They begin their own assault, using their martial arts skills to dispatch most of Angel's gang. Jacques puts dynamite in Angel's car and Angel narrowly escapes when the car explodes. Jacques and Angel begin to fight and just when Jacques is about to knock Angel out, Henry convinces him that it should be Martin who should fight Angel. Angel puts up much of the fight but Martin, finally having the advantage, beats Angel and kicks him while he is on the ground repeatedly until he is unconscious. Jacques finally tells Martin he did what he had to and the police show up, including a helicopter whose light shines on Angel.

Cast

Production
The film's budget was under $3 million.

Release
The film opened February 23, 1990 on 59 screens in Los Angeles and San Diego. Its first weekend of theatrical release was marked by a gang brawl at a drive-in theater in Westminster, California. It expanded to New York, Miami and Detroit on April 13, 1990.

Reception
The reception from critics was mixed.

References

External links
 
 

1990 films
American martial arts films
American action films
Films set in Los Angeles
Films shot in Los Angeles
1990 martial arts films
Films directed by Eric Karson
Films scored by Terry Plumeri
1990s English-language films
1990s American films